Nogent-sur-Marne is a railway station on RER train network in Nogent-sur-Marne, Val-de-Marne, France.

History
Nogent-sur-Marne station used to be served by the Bastille railway line (Paris Bastille–Marles-en-Brie), which ran from 1859 to 1969. It is now served by RER line A.

Transport

Train
The station is served by a train every 10 minutes at off-peak time in both directions. That frequency is increased during peak hours and falls to around 1 train every 15 minutes at late evening and early morning.

Bus connections 
The station is served by several buses:
  Noctilien network night bus line:  (from Paris - Gare de Lyon to Villiers-sur-Marne).

Traffic
2,771,411 people entered the station in 2014.

References

Railway stations in France opened in 1969
Railway stations in Val-de-Marne
Réseau Express Régional stations